Capital Idea! was a nine-day music festival in Ottawa, Ontario, Canada, organized by music blogger and concert promoter Calum Marsh. The festival took place from 21 to 30 June 2007, and featured high-profile indie acts. Despite a great deal of media attention in television, print and internet outlets, the festival failed to attract a large number of attendees.

Festival lineup 
The 2007 edition of Capital Idea! included over 30 musical acts across a wide range of genres. A partial list follows.

The Walkmen, The Fiery Furnaces, Destroyer, Damo Suzuki, The Wrens, Sunset Rubdown, Girl Talk, Russian Futurists, Born Ruffians, Frog Eyes, Crystal Castles and Montag.

See also 
 Pop Montreal

References 
 
 

Rock festivals in Canada
Music festivals in Ottawa
Music festivals established in 2007
Indie rock festivals